Alka-Seltzer is an effervescent antacid and pain reliever first marketed by the Dr. Miles Medicine Company of Elkhart, Indiana, United States. Alka-Seltzer contains three active ingredients: aspirin (acetylsalicylic acid) (ASA), sodium bicarbonate, and anhydrous citric acid. The aspirin is a pain reliever and anti-inflammatory, the sodium bicarbonate is an antacid, and the citric acid reacts with the sodium bicarbonate and water to form effervescence.

It was developed by head chemist Maurice Treneer. Alka-Seltzer is marketed for relief of minor aches, pains, inflammation, fever, headache, heartburn, stomachache, indigestion, acid reflux and hangovers, while neutralizing excess stomach acid. It was launched in 1931.

Its sister product, Alka-Seltzer Plus, treats cold and flu symptoms. A wide variety of formulae, many using acetaminophen (paracetamol) instead of aspirin, are available under the sister brand.

Product information

Alka-Seltzer is a combination of sodium bicarbonate, aspirin, and anhydrous citric acid, used for the relief of heartburn, acid indigestion, and stomach aches.
	 
Alka-Seltzer is sold in foil packets, each containing two tablets. Prior to 1984, it was also available stacked in glass tubes. It is available in many different flavors.

It was once marketed as a cure-all; at one time, its ads even suggested taking it for "the blahs". Subsequent promotion has taken into consideration that aspirin is a drug that is not tolerated by everyone, and the product is no longer advertised in this fashion.

Chemistry of the effervescence
Though important to the overall effect of the medication, the aspirin (acetylsalicylic acid) is not required to produce the effervescent action of Alka-Seltzer; the effervescence is produced by the baking soda (sodium bicarbonate) and citric acid reacting to form sodium citrate and carbon dioxide gas.

Marketing

The product has been extensively advertised since its launch in the United States. It was originally marketed by Mikey Wiseman, a company scientist of Dr. Miles Medicine Company, who also helped direct its development.

Print advertising was used immediately, and in 1932 the radio show Alka-Seltzer Comedy Star of Hollywood began, with National Barn Dance following in 1933, along with many more. The radio sponsorships continued into the 1950s, with the Alka-Seltzer Time show airing from 1949 to 1957.

In 1951, the "Speedy" character was introduced. The character was conceived by creative director George Pal of the Wade Advertising agency and designed by illustrator Wally Wood. Originally named Sparky, the name was changed to Speedy by sales manager Perry L. Shupert to align with that year's promotional theme, "Speedy Relief." Speedy appeared in over 200 TV commercials between 1954 and 1964. His body was one Alka-Seltzer tablet, while he wore another as a hat.

Buster Keaton appeared along with the animated Speedy Alka-Seltzer figure in a series of 1950s commercials based on the product slogan, "Relief is just a swallow away." Speedy Alka-Seltzer was voiced by Dick Beals. Speedy was revived for a "Plop, plop, fizz, fizz" song spot in 1976.

In his 1976 revival Beals proclaimed Alka-Seltzer's virtues and sang the "Plop, plop, fizz, fizz, oh what a relief it is" song in his iconic high, squeaky voice. In the early 1960s, a commercial showing two tablets dropping into a glass of water instead of the usual one caused sales to double.

Alka-Seltzer TV ads from the 1960s and 1970s in the US were among the most popular of the 20th century, ranking number 13, according to Advertising Age. To increase sales in a relatively flat business, Bayer  revived several of the vintage spots.
 
Paul Margulies (father of actress Julianna Margulies) created the famous "Plop, plop, fizz, fizz" ad campaign when he worked as a Madison Avenue ad executive. The ubiquitous jingle was composed by Tom Dawes—a former member of The Cyrkle. The slogan was altered to "Plink, plink, fizz" in the United Kingdom.

During the race for space in the early 1960s before the moon landing, there was a commercial with Speedy in a space suit and a jingle with the lyrics "On Man's first trip through space, I only hope that I'm aboard, securely strapped in place. They'll track our ship with radar and telescopes and soon, imagine seeing Speedy Alka-Seltzer on the moon!"

George Raft starred in the 1969 Alka-Seltzer commercial "The Unfinished Lunch". It consisted of Raft incarcerated in a prison lunchroom. He takes a bite of the prison food and recoils. Suddenly he bangs his cup on the steel table. It ripples throughout the room. He starts intoning "Alka-Seltzer, Alka-Seltzer..." Soon, the other hundreds of inmates do the same. (The commercial became so popular that several weeks later, Raft appeared as a guest on The Tonight Show Starring Johnny Carson. Raft told Carson that it took more than 7 hours to tape the 30-second commercial. Raft was enraged by the end of the day, thus making his inmate portrayal that much more convincing for the final editing. The film crew gave Raft his crumpled tin cup, which he showed to Carson and the audience.

An animated mid-1960s commercial, animated by R. O. Blechman, shows a man and his own stomach sitting opposite each other in chairs, having an argument moderated by their therapist in a voiceover. The stomach (voiced by Gene Wilder) accuses the man of purposely trying to irritate it. The man accuses his stomach of complaining too much about the foods he likes. The therapist suggests Alka-Seltzer, and further suggests that the two must take care of each other. The closing words are of the stomach saying to the man: "Well, I'll try — if you will."

Alka-Seltzer had a series of commercials during the mid-1960s that used a song called "No Matter What Shape (Your Stomach's In)". A different version was recorded by The T-Bones and was released as a single, which became a hit in 1966. The ads featured only the midsections (no faces) of people of all shapes and sizes. A clip of the ad can be seen briefly in the 1988 motion picture The In Crowd, immediately before the movie's first live broadcast of the fictitious "Perry Parker's Dance Party."

In an Alka-Seltzer commercial from 1969, an actor (played by Jack Somack) in a commercial for the fictional product "Magdalini's Meatballs" has to eat a meatball and then say "Mamma mia, that's-a spicy meat-a ball-a!" in an ersatz Italian accent. Take after take is ruined by some comedic trial or another (comedian Ronny Graham dropping the clapperboard). By the commercial's end, Jack has eaten so many meatballs that it's "Alka-Seltzer to the rescue." With his stomach settled, Jack does a perfect take, except that the oven door falls off. The director (off-camera) sighs and says, "OK, let's break for lunch."

A 1970 commercial shows a newlywed couple in the bedroom after the woman (played by Alice Playten) has finished serving her husband (played by Terry Kiser) a giant dumpling; the implication is that her cooking skills are severely lacking, despite her husband's lament, "I can't believe I ate that whole thing!", the commercial's catchphrase. She lies on the bed in delusional triumph. She offers her beleaguered husband a heart-shaped meatloaf; he disappears to take some Alka-Seltzer. When she hears the fizzy noise coming from the bathroom, he quickly covers the glass of dissolving Alka-Seltzer as she wonders aloud if it is raining. Just when he has recovered his well-being, he hears her misreading recipes for dinner the next night: "Marshmallowed meatballs," "medium salad snails," and "pouched (actually poached) oysters". He returns to the bathroom for more Alka-Seltzer. The catchphrase, Howie Cohen told the Los Angeles Times, was inspired when he ate too much of the food at a London commercial shoot because "I am a nice Jewish kid from the Bronx, so I ate everything," and when he told his wife "I can't believe I ate the whole thing", she said, "There's your next Alka-Seltzer commercial."

A 1971 commercial featured another catch-phrase from Cohen (along with Bob Pasqualina), "Try it, you'll like it!" It was remade with Kathy Griffin in 2006. In 1972, an actor (Milt Moss) spent the commercial moaning, "I can't believe I ate that who-o-o-o-o-ole thing," while his wife (Lynn Whinic) made sarcastic comments and finally advised him to take some Alka-Seltzer. In 2005, this ad was also remade, featuring Peter Boyle and Doris Roberts from the 1996–2005 TV sitcom Everybody Loves Raymond.

Sammy Davis, Jr. recorded two versions of the "Plop Plop Fizz Fizz" jingle in 1978, one of which (the "big band" version) was featured on a television commercial. Both the big band and rock versions had additional lyrics (with at least one verse unique to each song) written by Tom Dawes, former lead singer of The Cyrkle who wrote the original jingle.

In 2009, the brand was featured in television commercials supporting the United States Ski Team that included alpine skier Lindsey Vonn and Nordic combined skier Bill Demong. Miniature figures of the Speedy mascot were shown with each.  Alka-Seltzer products are sold in nighttime and daytime, or non drowsy, formulas.  The non-drowsy claims have recently been questioned.  

In December 2010, Alka-Seltzer began a series of new commercials featuring Speedy, using a CGI character, created by Animation Director David Hulin, to recreate the stop-motion puppetry of the 1950s and 1960s, with Speedy voiced by Debi Derryberry.

See also
 Carbonated water
 Brioschi

References

External links
 

Products introduced in 1931
Aspirin
Bayer brands
Drugs acting on the gastrointestinal system and metabolism
Clio Award winners
Antacids